Ibrahim Ali Patel was an Indian politician belonging to the Indian National Congress. He was MLA representing Vagra constituency in Bombay Currently In Gujarat, having won in 1952 Bombay Legislative Assembly General Election.

Family 

He is part of the Patel Family of Ikhar, the political and royal Family of Bharuch. His father Ali Raje Patel and grandfather Kika Patel was Police Patel and Sarpanch of Ikhar.

Politicians of The Patel family of Ikhar

References 

Year of birth missing
Year of death missing
Place of birth missing
Place of death missing
Indian National Congress politicians from Gujarat
Bombay State MLAs 1952–1957